New Zealand political leader Helen Clark assembled a "shadow cabinet" system amongst the Labour caucus following her election to the position of Leader of the Opposition in 1993. She composed this of individuals who acted for the party as spokespeople in assigned roles while she was Leader of the Opposition (1993–99).

As the Labour Party formed the largest party not in government, the frontbench team was as a result the Official Opposition of the New Zealand House of Representatives.

List of shadow ministers

Frontbench teams

1993–96
The lists below contains a list of Clark's spokespeople and their respective roles during the 44th Parliament. In the lead up to MMP several party defections took place during the parliamentary term, making reshuffles commonplace.

Clark announced her first lineup on 13 December 1993. Less than a year later, in October 1994, Peter Dunne split from Labour, leading to a rearranging of portfolios. Dunne's commerce and customs portfolios were given to Annette King and the revenue portfolio transferred to Jim Sutton. His seat on the frontbench  was allocated to Steve Maharey. In June 1995 two MPs, Clive Matthewson and Margaret Austin, left Labour to form a new party, United New Zealand. Deputy Leader David Caygill took the education portfolio from Austin and Annette King was given Matthewson's Social Welfare portfolio. In the same reshuffle Clark took on foreign affairs due to the impending retirement of David Lange.

In June 1996 Caygill announced his retirement and the education portfolio was given to Trevor Mallard. Jack Elder defected to New Zealand First in April 1996 and his overseas trade portfolio was allocated to Jim Sutton. In September 1996 the former leader Mike Moore, who had previously declined to take any portfolio, accepted the foreign affairs and overseas trade portfolios.

First iteration

Final iteration

1996–99
The list below contains a list of Clark's spokespeople and their respective roles during the 45th Parliament:

Clark announced her first post-election lineup on 20 December 1996. In August 1997 there was a reshuffle surrounding the removal of Lianne Dalziel as Shadow Minister of Health. She was instead made Shadow Attorney-General and given the portfolios of immigration, youth affairs and statistics. Annette King replaced her as Shadow Minister of Health with King's social welfare and racing portfolios being transferred to Steve Maharey and Damien O'Connor respectively. Jill Pettis gained the conservation portfolio from Pete Hodgson who was given labour from Maharey. In September 1999 Jim Sutton resigned as Shadow Minister of Forestry after a policy disagreement. The portfolio was given to Pete Hodgson. After Mike Moore left Parliament to become Director-General of the World Trade Organization the foreign affairs portfolio was given to Phil Goff and overseas trade allocated to Jim Sutton.

First iteration

Final iteration

Notes

References
 

New Zealand Labour Party
Clark, Helen
Helen Clark
1993 establishments in New Zealand
1999 disestablishments in New Zealand